West Hinsdale is one of three stations on Metra's BNSF Line in Hinsdale, Illinois. It is closed on weekends and holidays. In Metra's zone-based fare system, West Hinsdale is in zone D. As of 2018, West Hinsdale is the 143rd busiest of Metra's 236 non-downtown stations, with an average of 306 weekday boardings. There is an unstaffed weather shelter used only during rush hour. The station is immediately adjacent to Stough Park in Hinsdale and is located 0.5 miles from downtown Clarendon Hills, Illinois.

References

External links 

Station from Stough Street from Google Maps Street View

Metra stations in Illinois
Former Chicago, Burlington and Quincy Railroad stations
Hinsdale, Illinois
Railway stations in Cook County, Illinois
Railway stations in DuPage County, Illinois
Railway stations in the United States opened in 1875